SIIMA Award for Best Music Director – Telugu is presented by Vibri media group as part of its annual South Indian International Movie Awards, for best music production done by a music artist in Telugu Music. The award was first given in 2012 for songs and music albums released in 2011. Devi Sri Prasad is the most nominated with 11 nominations and most awarded with seven times winning the award.

Superlatives

Winners

Nominations 

 2012: S. Thaman – Dookudu
 M. M. Keeravani – Rajanna
 Kalyani Malik – Ala Modalaindi
 Ilaiyaraaja – Sri Rama Rajyam
 Devi Sri Prasad – 100% Love
 2013: Devi Sri Prasad – Gabbar Singh
 Devi Sri Prasad – Julai
 M. M. Keeravani – Eega
 S. Thaman – Businessman
 Mani Sharma – Racha
 2014: Devi Sri Prasad – Attarintiki Daredi
 Devi Sri Prasad – Iddarammayilatho
 Mickey J. Meyer – Seethamma Vakitlo Sirimalle Chettu
 S. Thaman – Naayak
 Anoop Rubens – Gunde Jaari Gallanthayyinde
 2015: Anoop Rubens – Manam
 S. Thaman – Race Gurram
 Ghibran – Run Raja Run
 Devi Sri Prasad – 1: Nenokkadine
 Mickey J. Meyer – Mukunda
 2016: Devi Sri Prasad – Srimanthudu
 Devi Sri Prasad – S/O Satyamurthy
 Gopi Sunder – Bhale Bhale Magadivoy
 M. M. Keeravani – Baahubali: The Beginning
 S. Thaman – Bruce Lee - The Fighter
 2017: Devi Sri Prasad – Janatha Garage
 Kalyan Koduri – Jyo Achyutananda
 Mickey J Meyer – A Aa
 S. Thaman – Sarrainodu
 Vivek Sagar – Pellichoopulu
 2018: M. M. Keeravani – Baahubali 2: The Conclusion
 Devi Sri Prasad – Khaidi No. 150
 Gopi Sundar – Ninnu Kori
 S. S. Thaman – Mahanubhavudu
 Shakti Kanth – Fidaa
 2019: Devi Sri Prasad – Rangasthalam
 Chaitan Bharadwaj – RX 100
 Gopi Sundar – Geetha Govindam
 Mickey J Meyer – Mahanati
 S. Thaman – Aravinda Sametha Veera Raghava
2019: Devi Sri Prasad – Maharshi
Mani Sharma – ISmart Shankar
Anirudh Ravichander – Jersey
Mickey J Meyer – Gaddalakonda Ganesh
Gopi Sundar – Majili
2020: S. Thaman – Ala Vaikunthapurramuloo
Devi Sri Prasad – Sarileru Neekevvaru
Mahati Swara Sagar – Bheeshma
Amit Trivedi – V
Kaala Bhairava – Colour Photo

See also 

 Tollywood

References 

Best Music Director Telugu
South Indian International Movie Awards winners
Film awards for Best Music Director
Indian music awards